Hugo Benjamín "Negro" Ibarra (born 1 April 1974), is an Argentine football manager and former player who played as a right back. He is the current manager of Boca Juniors. 

With 324 matches played, 10 goals scored and 15 titles won with Boca Juniors, Ibarra is considered the best right back in the history of the club.

Playing career 
Born in Pirané Department, northern province of Formosa, Ibarra went to Santa Fe Province to start playing in Colón. It was a second division team when he started playing professionally in 1993, but two years later the team got promoted to first division. His performance called Boca Juniors' attention, and he was transferred to the club he would late refer to as "my home".

After three successful seasons in Boca, Ibarra moved to Europe. Because he did not have a European passport, Ibarra was loaned back to Boca Juniors after playing his first season in Portuguese FC Porto. Porto loaned him to French Monaco FC a year later, and then to Spanish RCD Espanyol.

Ibarra played six matches for Argentina national football team, including Copa América 1999. While in Monaco, the team reached UEFA Champions League finals, beating in its way such teams as Real Madrid and Chelsea, to later lose 3–0 to his former club Porto, club that owned him at that moment.

In July 2005, after some difficult negotiations due to the economic crisis in Argentina, Hugo Ibarra went back to Boca Juniors, his last team. On 18 April 2007, he got back to Argentina national football team, as Argentina’s captain, to play a friendly match against Chile.

In September 2010, he announced his retirement from professional football.

Coaching career
At the end of 2011, Ibarra was hired in a youth coordinator role at Boca Juniors' youth academy. From the 2015 season, Ibarra became assistant coach of Boca's reserve team under manager Rolando Schiavi. 

In 2021, he began in a new role where he would be the nexus between amateur football and the Football Council in Boca Juniors. On 17 August 2021, Boca's reserve team manager, Sebastián Battaglia, was appointed first-team manager on an interim basis, while Ibarra and Mauricio Serna took charge of the reserve team, also on an interim basis.

Ibarra was named interim manager of Boca in July 2022, after Battaglia was sacked. On 29 November, he was confirmed as manager for the upcoming season.

Managerial statistics

Honours

Player 

Boca Juniors
 Primera División (5): 1998 Apertura, 1999 Clausura, 2005 Apertura, 2006 Clausura, 2008 Apertura
 Copa Libertadores (4): 2000, 2001, 2003, 2007
 Copa Intercontinental: 2000
 Copa Sudamericana (1): 2005
 Recopa Sudamericana (1): 2008

Porto
 Portuguese Supercup (1): 2001

Argentina
Copa America runner-up: 2007

Manager 
Boca Juniors
 Primera División (1): 2022

 Supercopa Argentina (1): 2022

References

External links
 Argentine Primera statistics at Fútbol XXI  
 
 
 Guardian statistics

1974 births
Living people
Argentine people of indigenous peoples descent
People from Formosa Province
Association football defenders
Argentine footballers
Argentine Primera División players
Ligue 1 players
Primeira Liga players
La Liga players
Club Atlético Colón footballers
Boca Juniors footballers
FC Porto players
AS Monaco FC players
RCD Espanyol footballers
Argentina international footballers
1999 Copa América players
2007 Copa América players
Expatriate footballers in France
Expatriate footballers in Monaco
Expatriate footballers in Spain
Expatriate footballers in Portugal
Argentine expatriate sportspeople in Monaco
Argentine expatriate sportspeople in Portugal
Argentine expatriate sportspeople in Spain
Argentine expatriate footballers
Argentine football managers
Boca Juniors managers